Rajendra Chawla is an Indian actor predominantly known for his roles in the films A Wednesday!, Mumbai Mirror, M.S. Dhoni: The Untold Story, and Paisa Paisa, and the television series Saas Bina Sasural, Ghar Ki Lakshmi Betiyann, Maat Pitaah Ke Charnon Mein Swarg, Sanskaar - Dharohar Apnon Ki, and Bahu Hamari Rajni Kant.

In 2020, he was seen in Sony SAB's Tera Yaar Hoon Main.

Filmography

Television

Film
 All films are in Hindi, unless otherwise noted.

References

External links
 
 

Living people
Year of birth missing (living people)
Indian television actors
Actors from Mumbai
Male actors in Hindi cinema